R-7A, R7A or variant may refer to:
 R-7A Semyorka, Soviet ICBM
 R7A (New York City Subway car)
 R7A Canadian postal code, see List of R postal codes of Canada
 Route 7A, see Route 7